Land is a former municipality in the old Oppland county, Norway. The  municipality existed from 1838 until its dissolution in 1847. The area is now divided between Nordre Land Municipality and Søndre Land Municipality. The administrative centre was the village of Fluberg. The municipality encompassed the whole area of the historical district of Land.

History
The municipality of Land was established on 1 January 1838 (see Formannskapsdistrikt law). The municipality was not long-lived. In 1847, the municipality was divided into the two municipalities of Nordre Land (population: 4,595) and Søndre Land (population: 4,604).

Name
The municipality was named after the historical district of Land which was once a petty kingdom of its own. The Old Norse form of the name was Land which means "land".

See also
List of former municipalities of Norway

References

Nordre Land
Søndre Land
Former municipalities of Norway
1838 establishments in Norway
1847 disestablishments in Norway